North Hills is an unincorporated community in Abington, Springfield, and Upper Dublin townships in Montgomery County, Pennsylvania, United States. It is served by the 19038 ZIP code. It is a lesser developed town than their neighbor, Glenside. It is served by the North Hills station on SEPTA Regional Rail's Lansdale/Doylestown Line.

It is bordered to the south-west by Mt. Carmel Avenue, to the north-west by Chelsea Avenue and North Hills Avenue, to the north-east by Jenkintown Road and to the south-east by rail road from Ardsley Train Station to the south.

Notable person 
 Ian Riccaboni, author, sports broadcaster for Phillies Nation TV and Ring of Honor wrestling

References 

Upper Dublin Township, Montgomery County, Pennsylvania
Unincorporated communities in Montgomery County, Pennsylvania
Unincorporated communities in Pennsylvania